John James Smethurst (born 1977) is a male former British gymnast.

Gymnastics career
Smethurst represented England and won a gold medal in the team event and a bronze medal on the floor, at the 1998 Commonwealth Games in Kuala Lumpur, Malaysia. Four years later he repeated the success of winning team gold and secured another bronze in the parallel bars at the 2002 Commonwealth Games in Manchester.

References

1977 births
Living people
British male artistic gymnasts
Gymnasts at the 1998 Commonwealth Games
Gymnasts at the 2002 Commonwealth Games
Commonwealth Games gold medallists for England
Commonwealth Games bronze medallists for England
Commonwealth Games medallists in gymnastics
Medallists at the 1998 Commonwealth Games
Medallists at the 2002 Commonwealth Games